Reyhan or Rayḥānī is one of the six canonical scripts of Perso-Arabic calligraphy. The word Reyhan means basil in Arabic and Persian. Reyhan is considered a finer variant of Muhaqqaq script, likened to flowers and leaves of basil.

Rayḥānī was developed during the Abbasid era by Ibn al-Bawwab. Academic studies of Rayhani have included analytical study of the technical characteristics of Yaqut al-Musta’simi's method.

References 

Arabic calligraphy
Islamic calligraphy